The North Harbour Sea Eagles were a New Zealand rugby league club that represented North Harbour in the Lion Red Cup from 1994 to 1996. For the first two seasons they were coached by Graeme Norton.

There two main feeder clubs were the Northcote Tigers and the Hibiscus Coast Raiders who both played in the first division of the Auckland Rugby League competition.

Notable players
Notable players included Ken McIntosh, Brian McClennan, 1994 captain Duane Mann, Fa'ausu Afoa, Paul Rauhihi, 1995 captain Don Stewart, Mike Setefano, Paki Tuimavave, Tony Tatupu, Latham Tawhai and Joe Vagana.

Notable Matches
In 1995 the Sea Eagles defeated the touring French side 40–10.

They also won the 1994 Lion Red Cup grand final against the Counties Manukau Heroes 24-16 and the 1995 Lion Red Cup grand final against the Auckland Warriors Colts 28–21. In the 1996 Lion Red Cup they lost the Elimination Semifinal 14–20 to the Waikato Cougars.

Season results

References

Auckland rugby league clubs
Defunct rugby league teams in New Zealand
1994 establishments in New Zealand
1996 disestablishments in New Zealand
Rugby clubs established in 1994